Mount Wellington is a mountain located at the Queens Reach arm of the Jervis Inlet within the Pacific Ranges of the Coast Mountains in British Columbia Canada.  The mountain was named during the 1860 survey by  who charted all of the area and named the mountain after Duke of Wellington who defeated Napoleon at the famous battle of Waterloo.

References

External links
 

Wellington
Wellington
New Westminster Land District